Bór may refer to:
Bór, Greater Poland Voivodeship (west-central Poland)
Bór, Lesser Poland Voivodeship (south Poland)
Bór, Opole Lubelskie County in Lublin Voivodeship (east Poland)
Bór, Zamość County in Lublin Voivodeship (east Poland)
Bór, Podlaskie Voivodeship (north-east Poland)
Bór, Pomeranian Voivodeship (north Poland)
Tadeusz Bór-Komorowski, a Polish officer and Commander of the Home Army

See also